The 2006–07 UCF Golden Knights men's basketball team was an NCAA Division I college basketball team that represented the University of Central Florida and competed in Conference USA. They played their home games at the UCF Arena in Orlando, Florida, and were led by head coach Kirk Speraw who was in his 14th season with the team. In the previous year, the Knights finished the season 14–15, 7–7 in C-USA play. Due to the Knights turn around from the previous year, Speraw was the named the 2007 Conference USA Coach of the Year.

The 2006–07 season marked the last year that the Knights played in the original UCF Arena, now known as The Venue at UCF. Starting the next season, the team moved into the new UCF Arena.

Roster

Schedule and results

|-
!colspan=8| Exhibition

|-
!colspan=8| Regular season (Non-conference play)
|-

|-
!colspan=8| Regular season (C-USA conference play)
|-

|-
!colspan=8| C-USA tournament
|-

|-
| colspan="8" | *Non-Conference Game. Rankings from AP poll. All times are in Eastern Time.
|}

References

UCF Knights men's basketball seasons
UCF
UCF Knights
UCF Knights